Fairy tales... fairy tales... fairy tales of the old Arbat (translit. Skazki... skazki... skazki starogo Arbata) is a Soviet feature film directed by Savva Kulish, filmed in 1982 on the basis of Aleksei Arbuzov's play Fairy Tales of the Old Arbat.

Plot 
In one of the quiet cozy alleyways of old Moscow, lives a talented puppet master. He has a faithful friend Christopher, son  Kuzya and many dolls. Suddenly, a sweet and tender girl, Viktosha, appears in the house, which was loved by her father, son, and even dolls.

Cast 
Igor Vladimirov as  Fyodor Kuzmich Balyasnikov, puppeteer
Zinovy Gerdt as  Christopher
Larisa Suchkova as Viktosha (voiced by Olga Gobzeva)
Kirill Arbuzov as Kuzma Balyasnikov
Valery Storozhik as Lev Aleksandrovich Gartvig
Olga Barnet (episode)
Natalya Khorokhorina (episode)

Filming
The film was shot at Bolshoy Gnezdnikovsky Lane in Moscow.

References

External links 

1982 films
1982 comedy films
Soviet films based on plays
Soviet comedy films
Films set in Moscow
Mosfilm films
1980s Russian-language films